Iwamoto Mari (巖本 真理, 19 January 1926―11 May 1979) was a Japanese violinist.

Biography 
Born in Japan to a Japanese father (Masahito Iwamoto) and an American mother (Marguerite, nee Magruder). She took violin lessons from Anna Bubnova-Ono (Anna Dmitrievna Bubnova) after age 6. She was a child prodigy, winning the All Japan Music Competition's violin category in 1937.

From 1946 to 1949, she was a professor at the Tokyo Academy of Music, resigning the post in 1949 in order to spend a year in the USA. She stayed there in a year and half, and took lesson of George Enescu in Chicago, and Louis Persinger in New York at The Juilliard School. On 14 June 1950, she took a recital at the Town Hall.

She resumed to play a soloist after coming back to Japan. In addition, She founded the Iwamoto Mari String Quartet in 1967, with violinist Tomoda Yoshiaki, viola player Suganuma Junji and cellist Kuranuma Toshio; the quartet won a special prize at the Suntory Music Award in 1979, shortly prior to Mari's death from cancer on 11 May 1979.

References 
 
  Accessible via Google Books.

Notes
The clip from the Ozu film "Late Spring" can be see here.  http://www.otto5.com/_video/Iwamoto_Clip.mp4

Japanese classical violinists
1926 births
1979 deaths
20th-century classical violinists
20th-century Japanese musicians
Women classical violinists
20th-century women musicians